Lu Yong (born January 1, 1986, in Liuzhou, Guangxi) is a male Chinese weightlifter and Olympic gold medalist. He is 172 cm tall.

In the 85 kg category, Lu won the silver medal in the World Championships in 2005 but placed sixth in the World Championships in 2007 due to a sprain injury during the competition.

He qualified for the 85 kg division finals, and subsequently won gold at the event in the 2008 Summer Olympics. Lu Yong had a 180kg Snatch and 214kg Clean and Jerk for an overall total of 394kg. Andrei Rybakou (BLR) also finished with an overall 394kg but since Lu Yong weighed in at 84.41kg and Andrei 84.69, Lu Yong took the gold medal. This was a huge victory for Lu Yong because Andrei had earlier set a snatch record of 185kg. Originally, Lu Yong clean and jerked 214 on his second lift but it was overruled and he had to resort to his third and last lift to succeed and win the gold. 

He next major international gold medal victory took place in the 85 kg event at the 2009 World Weightlifting Championships in Goyang, South Korea, followed by his first Asian Games gold medal in Guangzhou in 2010.

See also
China at the 2012 Summer Olympics

References 
 China at the 2008 Summer Olympics

1986 births
Living people
Olympic gold medalists for China
Olympic weightlifters of China
People from Liuzhou
Weightlifters at the 2008 Summer Olympics
Weightlifters at the 2012 Summer Olympics
Olympic medalists in weightlifting
Asian Games medalists in weightlifting
Weightlifters from Guangxi
Weightlifters at the 2006 Asian Games
Weightlifters at the 2010 Asian Games
Medalists at the 2008 Summer Olympics
Chinese male weightlifters

Asian Games gold medalists for China
Asian Games silver medalists for China
Medalists at the 2006 Asian Games
Medalists at the 2010 Asian Games
World Weightlifting Championships medalists
21st-century Chinese people